Moodna pallidostrinella, the paler moodna moth, is a species of snout moth in the genus Moodna. It was described by Herbert H. Neunzig in 1990 from Big Pine Key, in the US state of Florida. The species has a wider distribution though, including Florida, Georgia, Maryland, New York, Ontario, South Carolina and Tennessee.

References

Moths described in 1990
Phycitinae